Rade Dugalić (born 5 November 1992) is a Serbian professional footballer who plays as a centre-back for Chinese Super League club Meizhou Hakka.

Career
Born in Prokuplje, Serbia, back then within FR Yugoslavia, Dugalić started playing with FK Radnički Niš, however he spent much time on loan, first with Radnik Surdulica and then with Car Konstantin, both playing in Serbian League East, Serbian third level.  In summer 2013 he moved to FK Sinđelić Niš and played with them one season.

In the season 2014–15 he played in Armenia with Ulisses.

Dugalić made his professional debut in the Russian Football National League for Torpedo Armavir on 12 July 2015 in a game against Zenit-2 St. Petersburg.

On 13 July 2018, Dugalić signed a 2-year contract with Yenisey Krasnoyarsk.

On 19 January 2019, Kairat announced the singing of Dugalić to a two-year contract.

On 21 April 2022, Dugalić joined Chinese Super League club Meizhou Hakka.

Honours
Tosno
 Russian Cup: 2017–18

References

External links
 Player page on the FNL website

1992 births
Living people
People from Prokuplje
Serbian footballers
Association football defenders
FK Radnički Niš players
FK Radnik Surdulica players
FK Sinđelić Niš players
FK Olimpik players
Ulisses FC players
FC Tosno players
FC Armavir players
FC Yenisey Krasnoyarsk players
FC Kairat players
Meizhou Hakka F.C. players
Russian Premier League players
Chinese Super League players
Serbian expatriate footballers
Expatriate footballers in Bosnia and Herzegovina
Expatriate footballers in Armenia
Expatriate footballers in Russia
Expatriate footballers in Kazakhstan
Expatriate footballers in China
Serbian expatriate sportspeople in China
Serbian expatriate sportspeople in Russia
Serbian expatriate sportspeople in Kazakhstan
Serbian expatriate sportspeople in Armenia
Serbian expatriate sportspeople in Bosnia and Herzegovina